Wasco State Airport  is a public airport located one mile (1.6 km) east of Wasco in Sherman County, Oregon, United States.

External links

Airports in Sherman County, Oregon